.30 Super Carry is a rimless pistol cartridge introduced by Federal Premium in early 2022. It was designed as a competitor to 9×19mm Luger and .380 ACP for use in semi-automatic handguns, where its smaller dimensions are intended to permit greater magazine capacity without increasing physical magazine size. The cartridge's ballistic performance is claimed by its manufacturers to rival that of 9×19 Luger.

The round when initially released by Federal was loaded for 45,000 pounds per square inch (psi). The maximum pressure rating for a cartridge is 52,000psi.

Among the first pistols chambered in .30 Super Carry were the Smith & Wesson Shield EZ 30 SC and the Shield Plus 30 SC.

Dimensions

Synonyms
.30 Caliber
8mm 
Super 8mm

References 

Weapons and ammunition introduced in the 21st century
Pistol and rifle cartridges
Weapons and ammunition introduced in 2022